Eucereon confine is a moth of the subfamily Arctiinae. It was described by Gottlieb August Wilhelm Herrich-Schäffer in 1855. It is found in Florida, Mexico, Guatemala and Costa Rica.

References

 

confine
Moths described in 1855